Vikramgad is a census town in Jawhar subdivision of Palghar district of Maharashtra state in Konkan division.

In Vikramgad, Nature Trail is a well known weekend picnic spot. Vikramgad can be accessed from Wada, Jawhar, and Palghar. Vikramgad is a taluka. It is famous for its Weekly Bazaar (Budhwar Bazar) on Wednesdays. People travel by private vehicle or use the bus service.

Demographics 
In 2011, Vikramgad had a population of 5,991.

Literacy levels were at 82.77%, higher than the national average. 95.79% of the population are Hindu and 3.12% are Muslim.

The working population of Vikramgad consists of 2,278 people. 73.44% of these people engaged in main work and 26.56% engaged in marginal work.

Education 

Vikramgad tehsil has two colleges:

Onde Village Arts Commerce and Science College opened in 2002 and offers a Bachelor of Arts and a Bachelor of Science
Government Polytechnic opened in 2011 and offers Diplomas in Engineering.

References 

Cities and towns in Palghar district
Talukas in Maharashtra
Tourist attractions in Palghar district